The 2021 Porsche Carrera Cup Italia season was the fifteenth Porsche Carrera Cup Italy season. It began on 5 June at Misano World Circuit Marco Simoncelli and ended on 31 October in Autodromo Nazionale di Monza, after six events with two races at each event.

Teams and drivers

Race calendar and results 
Each round includes two races one on Saturday and one in Sunday. The grid of the first race is defined by a qualifying session; for the second race, the starting grid is determined by the results of the first race with the first six positions reversed. The calendar was announced on 15 December 2020. On January 21 2021 it was announced that the Mugello race will be brought forward by a week.

Championship standings

Scoring system
Points were awarded to the top fifteen classified finishers in all races. The pole-sitter in Race 1 also received three points, and one point was given to the driver who set the fastest lap in both races. No extra points were awarded to the pole-sitter in Race 2, as the grid for Race 2 was set by reversing the top six finishers of Race 1.

Race 1 points
Points were awarded to the top 15 classified finishers, three points were given for qualifying on Pole Position, and one point was awarded to the driver who set the fastest lap in the race.

Race 2 points
Points were awarded to the top 15 classified finishers, and one point was awarded to the driver who set the fastest lap in the race.

Drivers' Championship
Source:

Notes
† – Driver did not finish the race, but were classified as they completed over 75% of the race distance.

Teams' Championship

References

External links 

 

Porsche Carrera Cup Italy seasons
Porsche Carrera Cup Italy
Porsche Carrera Cup Italia